Mohammad Mubeen Mughal (18 June 1992 – 2 February 2016) was a Pakistani cricketer. He played six first-class and six List A matches for Sialkot between 2011 and 2012. He took five catches on debut, all Test players.

He died of hepatitis at the age of 23. The local cricket association set up a tournament in his memory.

References

External links
 

1992 births
2016 deaths
Pakistani cricketers
Sialkot cricketers
Cricketers from Sialkot
Deaths from hepatitis
Infectious disease deaths in Punjab, Pakistan